Nino Gvetadze is a Georgian classical concert pianist.

Early life and education
Born and raised in Tbilisi, Georgia, Gvetadze studied in Tbilisi State Conservatoire and later in The Hague and Conservatorium van Amsterdam. Her teachers were Veronika Tumanishvili, Nodar Gabunia, Nana Khubutia, Paul Komen and Jan Wijn.

Competitions
Nino Gvetadze won Second Prize, Press Prize and Audience Prize at the International Franz Liszt Piano Competition in 2008. In 2010 she was awarded the Borletti-Buitoni Trust Award.

Performances
Nino Gvetadze plays in concert halls as Concertgebouw Amsterdam, Centre for Fine Arts, Brussels, Konzerthaus Berlin, Wigmore Hall London, Tonhalle, Zürich and many others. Gvetadze appears as a soloist with Residentie Orchestra, Rotterdam Philharmonic Orchestra, Brussels Philharmonic, Netherlands Philharmonic Orchestra, Amsterdam Sinfonietta, Mahler Chamber Orchestra, Seoul Philharmonic Orchestra, Münchner Philharmoniker.

Nino Gvetadze participates in International Festivals, among those Kuhmo Chamber Music Festival, Tbilisi Wind Festival, Festival dei Due Mondi, Tsinandali Festival.

Recordings
Nino Gvetadze has recorded 4 solo CDs featuring the works of Franz Liszt, Claude Debussy, Modest Mussorgsky and Sergei Rachmaninoff in record labels Orchid Classics, Brilliant Classics, Etcetera Records.

External links 
 Official Website
 Record Label 
 Profile on Borletti-Buitoni Website

References 

20th-century classical pianists
Classical pianists from Georgia (country)
Year of birth missing (living people)
Living people
21st-century classical pianists